The 1982–83 National Hurling League was the 52nd season of the National Hurling League.

Division 1

Division 1 saw a major restructuring with the abolition of the fourteen-team top flight which had previously been divided into two groups of seven teams. For the 1982-83 season, Division 1 was limited to a single group of eight teams.

Kilkenny came into the season as defending champions of the 1981-82 season.

On 24 April 1983, Kilkenny won the title after a 2-14 to 2-12 win over Limerick in the final. It was their 5th league title overall and their second in succession.

Kilkenny's Billy Fitzpatrick was the Division 1 top scorer with 4-33.

Table

Group stage results

Play-off

Knock-out stage

Semi-finals

Final

Scoring statistics

Top scorers overall

Top scorers in a single game

Division 2

On 27 March 1983, Limerick won the title after a 2-16 to 1-7 win over Antrim in the final round of the group stage.

Laois secured promotion to the top flight as the second-placed team. Carlow, who lost all of their group stage games, were relegated to Division 3.

Table

Division 3

Table

Division 4

Table A

Table B

Knock-out stage

Semi-finals

Finals

External links

References

National Hurling League seasons
League
League